Self-Portrait is a self-portrait in oils by the Italian painter Giovanni Bellini, dating to c.1500 and now in the Galleria Capitolina of the Capitoline Museums in Rome.

15th-century portraits
Bellini
Portraits by Giovanni Bellini